Birdworld is the United Kingdom's largest bird park, covering . It is located in the East Hampshire district, close to the village of Bucks Horn Oak and the surrounding Alice Holt Forest. It is part of the parent company Haskins Garden Centre Ltd., which also owns the nearby Forest Lodge garden centre and Garden Style, a wholesale plant seller.

Birds
There are more than 180 different species of bird within the collection, 40 of which are listed as vulnerable, threatened or endangered on the IUCN Red List. These include the Bali starling, Montserrat oriole, northern bald ibis and the Kea.

There is a flock of great white pelicans, one of the largest free flying parrot aviaries in the country, two penguin colonies, a seashore themed aviary and the Terry Pratchett Owl Parliament - which pays tribute to the author Terry Pratchett and is one of the few exhibits in the world to be themed upon Discworld.

Other exhibits
There is also a group of Hermann's tortoises in the park, and several wild grey herons that are attracted by the fish fed to the Humboldt penguins and Great white pelicans.

The Jenny Wren Farm is a children's petting zoo, and houses a number of farm animals, including the Whitefaced Woodland, a breed of sheep listed as vulnerable by the Rare Breeds Survival Trust.

External links

References

Zoos in England
Bird parks
Tourist attractions in Hampshire
Buildings and structures in Hampshire
Zoos established in 1967